James Gordon (August 26, 1786 – April 10, 1865) was a merchant and political figure in Upper Canada and Canada West.

He was born in Inverness, Scotland in 1786 and studied at the Inverness Royal Academy. He came to Amherstburg in Upper Canada. He served in the local militia, becoming lieutenant in 1809 and lieutenant colonel in 1822. He represented Kent in the Legislative Assembly of Upper Canada from 1820 to 1828. In 1822, he was named justice of the peace in the Western District. He was appointed to the Legislative Council of Upper Canada in 1829 and to the Legislative Council of the Province of Canada in 1845.

He died in Toronto in 1865.

References
Becoming Prominent: Leadership in Upper Canada, 1791-1841, J.K. Johnson (1989)

1786 births
1865 deaths
Members of the Legislative Assembly of Upper Canada
Members of the Legislative Council of Upper Canada
Members of the Legislative Council of the Province of Canada
Scottish emigrants to pre-Confederation Ontario
People educated at Inverness Royal Academy
Scottish merchants
People from Inverness
Immigrants to Upper Canada
Canadian justices of the peace
19th-century British businesspeople